Sabina Albertovna Giliazova (born 30 September 1994) is a Russian judoka. She is a bronze medalist at the European Judo Championships.

Career
In 2020, she won one of the bronze medals in the women's 48 kg event at the 2020 Judo Grand Slam Düsseldorf held in Düsseldorf, Germany.

In 2021, she won one of the bronze medals in the women's 48 kg event at the 2021 European Judo Championships held in Lisbon, Portugal.

Achievements

References

External links
 

Living people
1994 births
Russian female judoka
Sportspeople from Chelyabinsk Oblast
21st-century Russian women